is a Japanese manga series written and illustrated by Kia Asamiya. It was originally serialized in Kodansha's magazine Monthly Afternoon.

The manga was adapted into a three-part anime original video animation that was licensed in the North America by ADV Films.

The opening theme is called "I Was Born to fall in Love" and the end theme is called "Full Up Mind", both by Masami Okui. As well as the soundtrack, a single of the opening theme and three image albums - Compiler, Assembler and Interpreter - were released.

Plot
Compiler (as in a source code compiler) features two girls, Compiler and Assembler, who arrived on earth from 2-D cyberspace to play a "game" in which they will delete the real world and reform it. However, they move in with two young men called Toshi and Nachi and lose interest in the game. After Toshi is injured and the game is cancelled, two beings called Plasma and Compiler 2 are sent in to erase the girls.

References

External links 
 

1991 manga
1994 anime OVAs
1995 anime OVAs
ADV Films
Kia Asamiya
Kodansha manga
Seinen manga
Studio Fantasia